Sir William Elliot Johnson KCMG (10 April 18628 December 1932) was an Australian politician. He was a long-serving member of the House of Representatives (1903–1928) and served non-consecutive terms as Speaker of the House (1913–1914, 1917–1923), the first person to do so. He began his career in the Australian Labor Party (ALP) during the early 1890s, but was a member of the anti-Labor parties throughout his tenure in parliament.

Early life
Johnson was born at Newcastle upon Tyne, England, the son of a scene-painter. He ran away from home at 13, worked in the telegraph office at London, and afterwards assisted his father scene-painting at Covent Garden theatre. He was then apprenticed on a sailing-ship and after obtaining his second mate's certificate, settled in Sydney in 1883. He took much interest in the free-trade movement and was also a follower of Henry George.

Johnson was an early member of the Labor Electoral League of New South Wales and served as president of its Newtown branch. He was also a contributor to the Labour Defence Journal. At the 1894 general election he was an unsuccessful candidate for the seat of Marrickville. Johnson later left the party on the grounds that it had "turned wrongly towards socialism and state interference". He was subsequently honorary secretary of the Free Trade and Liberal Association of New South Wales.

Politics

In December 1903 he was elected a member of the federal House of Representatives for Lang. He was from 1910 to 1913 whip and secretary to the Liberal Party and was a member of the panel of Deputy Chairmen of Committees. He took much interest in the selection of the site for the federal capital, and nominated the Yass-Canberra site which was eventually chosen. In 1911 he was one of the Australian parliamentary representatives at the coronation of King George V.

He was elected Speaker of the House in 1913 and held this position until after the 1914 election. He was again Speaker from June 1917 to February 1923, when William Watt was chosen for the position. Johnson was a man of great industry who made it his business to be thoroughly acquainted with the subjects under debate. He was particularly interested in the question of immigration. As Speaker he was quietly dignified, courteous and efficient.

He was defeated at the 1928 general election.

Personal life
Johnson died at Geelong, Victoria, in 1932. He married, but his wife died before him. He was survived by a daughter. He was created a Knight Commander of the Order of St Michael and St George (KCMG) in 1920.

In private life his hobby was painting and etching. A set of his etchings is at the National Library of Australia, Canberra.

References

1862 births
1932 deaths
Members of the Australian House of Representatives for Lang
Members of the Australian House of Representatives
Australian Knights Commander of the Order of St Michael and St George
Australian politicians awarded knighthoods
Free Trade Party members of the Parliament of Australia
Commonwealth Liberal Party members of the Parliament of Australia
Nationalist Party of Australia members of the Parliament of Australia
Speakers of the Australian House of Representatives
English emigrants to colonial Australia
20th-century Australian politicians
Australian etchers
Australian Labor Party politicians